Albert Kibichii Rop (born 17 July 1992) is a Kenya athlete specialising in the long-distance events. He represents Bahrain in international competitions. In July 2013 at a meeting in Monaco, he set a new 5000 metres Asian record of 12:51.96.

Competition record

Personal bests
Outdoor
1500 metres – 3:45.7 (Nairobi 2013)
3000 metres – 7:32.02 (Paris 2016)
5000 metres – 12:51.96 (Monaco 2013)
10,000 metres – 28:21.08 (Cairo 2019)
10k (road) – 27:44 (Utrecht 2018)
Half marathon – 1:01:21 (Valencia 2018)
Indoor
3000 metres – 7:38.77 (Ghent 2014)
5000 metres – 13:09.43 (Birmingham 2017)

See also
List of Asian Games medalists in athletics

References

External links

 

1992 births
Living people
Bahraini male long-distance runners
Kenyan male long-distance runners
Bahraini male cross country runners
Kenyan male cross country runners
Olympic male long-distance runners
Olympic athletes of Bahrain
Athletes (track and field) at the 2016 Summer Olympics
Asian Games silver medalists for Bahrain
Asian Games bronze medalists for Bahrain
Asian Games medalists in athletics (track and field)
Athletes (track and field) at the 2014 Asian Games
Athletes (track and field) at the 2018 Asian Games
Medalists at the 2014 Asian Games
Medalists at the 2018 Asian Games
World Athletics Championships athletes for Bahrain
Asian Cross Country Championships winners
Naturalized citizens of Bahrain
Kenyan emigrants to Bahrain
Foreign-born athletes of Bahrain